San Miguel de Mayocc District is one of ten districts of the province Churcampa in Peru.

References